Mills Pond District is a national historic district located at St. James in Suffolk County, New York.  The district includes nine contributing buildings.  Prominent buildings within the district are the Mills Homestead (1837), Wegrzyn Barn, ice house, Wegrzyn House (c. 1730), Dougherty House (c. 1730), Papadakos House (c. 1820), Gyrodene Gambrel Roofed House (c. 1800), and Perry House (c. 1880).

It was added to the National Register of Historic Places in 1973.

References
 

Historic districts in Suffolk County, New York
Historic districts on the National Register of Historic Places in New York (state)
National Register of Historic Places in Suffolk County, New York